Brian Leys (born 7 February 1968) is a former Australian rules footballer who played with Richmond in the Australian Football League (AFL) and Port Adelaide in the South Australian National Football League (SANFL).

Leys, a defender from Trafalgar, played seven seasons for Richmond, from 1988 to 1994. He spent the next stage of his career in South Australia, playing with SANFL club Port Adelaide, mainly as a centre half back. In his five seasons at Port Adelaide he was member of four premiership teams, in 1995, 1996, 1998 and 1999.

In November 2009, Leys was appointed Chief Executive of the Perth Football Club. Leys returned to Port Adelaide in 2012, as general manager. He resigned from his role in May 2013, for family reasons. In 2016 he returned to coaching as the coach of the Glenunga  Rams Football Club, a Adelaide Football League team. In his second season coaching the Rams he steered them to a premiership.

References

1968 births
Australian rules footballers from Victoria (Australia)
Richmond Football Club players
Port Adelaide Football Club (SANFL) players
Port Adelaide Football Club players (all competitions)
Port Adelaide Magpies players
Port Adelaide Football Club administrators
Perth Football Club administrators
Living people